The Canadian Vickers Vigil was a single-seat patrol aircraft designed to meet a Royal Canadian Air Force requirement for a forest fire patrol aircraft.

Design and development
In 1926, the RCAF issued specifications for an aircraft to replace the Airco DH.4 aircraft used at the time. Canadian Vickers designed the Vigil which had steel-structured wings with aluminum skin throughout, and was a strut-braced sesquiplane. The aircraft was overweight, which impacted the aircraft service ceiling and performance, which in turn made it unsuitable for its role. Only one was ever built.

Operational history
Unfit for its intended role, the aircraft was sent to Rockcliffe Air Station in Ottawa, Ontario. It was used by pilots stationed there for proficiency flying. The aircraft was used for airmail deliveries to Maritime Canada between January 1929 until February 1929. About a year later, the need for repair and overhaul became necessary and after assessment it was determined this was not cost effective, so the aircraft was scrapped.

Specifications

References

External links

1920s Canadian patrol aircraft
Vigil
Sesquiplanes
Single-engined tractor aircraft
Aircraft first flown in 1928